IFK Vaxholm is a Swedish football club located in Vaxholm.
They were founded 18 April 1920 by Captain Öhngren and they are a part of Idrottsföreningen Kamraterna.  Of course as a part of IFK they need to wear the blue and white home colours.
Ever since the 1940s IFK Vaxholm have played their home games at SEB-Vallen, or as the locals call it, Vaxö IP.

Background
IFK Vaxholm currently plays in Division 4 Stockholm Norra which is the sixth tier of Swedish football. They play their home matches at the SEB-Vallen in Vaxholm .
The ladies team currently plays in division 5 Stockholm A.
The club has, except 2 senior teams, 18 different age groups between the ages of 5–15, they also have 2 employees working with the club and the youth section.

The club is affiliated to Stockholms Fotbollförbund.

IFK Vaxholm finished 8th place in the 6th tier 2017.

History
The 18 April 1920, a crowd of 50 people gathered to form a sports club in Vaxholm. At first they were i part of IFK Stockholm but in August 1921 they became an independent part of IFK. In 1984 they changed their namn to "Vaxholm/KA 1 IF" after a tie-up with "Vaxholms Kustartilleriregementes IF" but 1989 they changed back. They have had several different kinds of sports during the years:Skiing, bandy, table-tennis, ice hockey and football along with a couple of other sports. Now they only play football. IFK Vaxholm has almost 800 members and they are the biggest sports club in Vaxholm.

In 1974 the first, and only so far, IFK Vaxholm team made it to the "S:t Erikscupen" final. The girls lost VS Rågsveds IF with 5–0.

IFK Vaxholms home ground, Vaxö IP, was founded in 1943 and since 1988 the ground have had artificial grass.

According to Vaxholms website Jesper Winzerling is the best goalscorer in IFK Vaxholm history, 78 goals in 79 games. This statistics haven't been updated since 2007.

Season to season
This only apply to the men's 1st team.

Attendances

In recent seasons IFK Vaxholm have had the following average attendances:

The 200-games Club

This is a list of players who have played more than 200 games for the club:
 Lars Wohlfart 266
 Lennart Rundlöf 237
 Leopold Granquist 230
 Ulf Hägglund 220
 Christer Thorell 217
 Bengt Sandell 212
 Rickard Tepponen 209
 Rolf Olofsson 200
 Bo Eriksson 200
 Nicklas Ewertzh 200+

IFK Centralorganisation gives out an award if you have played more than 20 years for your club, and so far 3 men have got this prize in IFK Vaxholm:

 Tore Hedström – Born in 1916 and received the award in 1960.
 Otto Malmlund – Born in 1909 and received the award in 1960.
 Harry Svensson – Born in 'unknown' and received the award in 1960.

Note! This list haven't been updated since 2006.

Footnotes

External links
  Official website

Football clubs in Stockholm
1920 establishments in Sweden
Idrottsföreningen Kamraterna